The Islas Borrachas is an archipelago in the Caribbean Sea which consists of three main islands and several islets belonging to Venezuela. They are located north of the State of Anzoategui, west of the Chimanas Islands, and northwest of the city of Puerto la Cruz. Under the 19 December 1973 Decree No. 1534, they belong to the Mochima National Park.

See also
Geography of Venezuela

References

External links
Location map

Caribbean islands of Venezuela
Mochima National Park
Climbing areas of Venezuela
Archipelagoes of Venezuela